Burditt Lake Water Aerodrome  is located  north of Burditt Lake, Ontario, Canada.

References

Registered aerodromes in Rainy River District
Seaplane bases in Ontario